Elhad Naziri (born 29 December 1992) is an Azerbaijani former international footballer who played as a defender.

Football career
Elhad Naziri was born in Baku, Azerbaijan. He played for FK Qarabağ's and Neftchi Baku youth teams. He started his professional career in 2011 with Lokomotiv Bilajary, a club from the Azerbaijan First Division. His second club was Milsami in Moldovan National Division where he would play six matches. He was transferred to FC Petrolul Ploiești in 2013.

In August 2013 Naziri signed for Ravan Baku from Petrolul Ploiești. Before the end of August, he would see his contract cancelled, and he would on to sign a one-year deal with fellow Azerbaijan Premier League side Inter Baku. Naziri was made a free agent when Araz-Naxçıvan folded and withdrew from the Azerbaijan Premier League on 17 November 2014. Naziri signed with Metalul Reșița on 26 February 2016.

International career
He made his national team debut on 14 November 2012 against Northern Ireland in a 2014 FIFA World Cup qualification.

Career statistics

Honours

Club
 Petrolul Ploiești
Cupa României (1): 2012–13

 Neftchala
Azerbaijan First Division (1): 2014–15

References

External links

1992 births
Living people
Association football defenders
Azerbaijani footballers
Azerbaijan international footballers
Azerbaijani expatriate footballers
Expatriate footballers in Moldova
Expatriate footballers in Romania
Azerbaijani expatriate sportspeople in Romania
FC Petrolul Ploiești players
CS Sportul Snagov players
Liga I players
Liga II players
Footballers from Baku
Araz-Naxçıvan PFK players